Sulochana is a character featured in Hindu literature. She is the daughter of the king of the serpents, Shesha, and married to Meghanada (Indrajita), the eldest son of Ravana. Sulochana finds no mention in the Valmiki Ramayana, and appears in later versions of the epic.

Literature 
In versions of the Ramayana, following the death of her husband, Sulochana urged her father-in-law, Ravana, to obtain the former's head from Rama, so that she could ritually perform the practice of sati. Ravana informed her that she would have to obtain her departed husband's head on her own. Despite the fears of his ministers that Sulochana would be imprisoned by Rama, Ravana gave her leave to go in person to the battlefield to make the request. Sulochana successfully received the head of Meghanada.

In the ballad Meghnad Bodh Kavya, Prameela is said to be Indrajit's wife. Prameela is regarded to be another name of Sulochana.

In popular culture

Her story has been the basis of many films, including Sati Sulochana (1921) directed by G.V. Sane. a silent film, followed by Sati Sulochana, 1934 Kannada film was the first Kannada language talkie film, also Sati Sulochana (1961 film) in Telugu starring N. T. Rama Rao.  also in Hindi film 'Sati Naag Kanya' by Babubhai Mistri starring Vikram Gokhale and Jaishree Gadkar.

The Ballad Of Sulochana is a favourite ballad of Marathi women, sung in most families. Noted Tamil scholar S. K. Ramarajan wrote a noted epyllion, Meganadham, the tragedy of Indrajit, known for its characterisation of Indrajit's wife Sulochana.

There is a prominent character named Sulochana Amavasya in the video game Cultist Simulator. Like the mythical Sulochana, this character is noted for her bright, alluring eyes and for her phlegmatic countenance.

References

External links
 Valmiki Ramayana Book X. War in Ceylon (Lanka Kanda) translated by Ralph T. H. Griffith (1870–1874)
 

Characters in the Ramayana